The Westminster Terrace is a private housing estate located in Yau Kom Tau, Tsuen Wan District, New Territories, Hong Kong.

Developed by Grosvenor Group in conjunction with Asia Standard Group, the single residential building consists of 59 four ensuite-bedroom duplex flats ranging from 3,200 to 6,500 sq ft.

Politics
The Westminster Terrace is located in Lai To constituency of the Tsuen Wan District Council. It was formerly represented by Ronald Tse Man-chak, who was elected in the 2019 elections until July 2021.

See also 
 Golden Villa
 Bellagio (Hong Kong)

References

External links

 The Westminster Terrace
 Grosvenor - The Westminster Terrace

Residential buildings completed in 2010
Tsuen Wan District
Private housing estates in Hong Kong